Pocketbook is a Sydney-based free budget planner and personal finance app launched in 2012. The app helps users setup and manage budgets, track spending and manage bills. Pocketbook is the first personal finance app in Australia to offer users the ability to manage their money through linking their bank accounts. As of 2016 Pocketbook claims to support over 250,000 Australians, in January 2018 that number was 435,000.

History
Pocketbook is founded by Alvin Singh and Bosco Tan in 2012. It was conceived in 2011 in a Wolli Creek apartment as a tool for Alvin and Bosco to take control of their money. The app has been featured on CNET, Business Insider and other popular media outlets. In September 2016, Pocketbook was acquired by ZIP Co Ltd.

Features
The app syncs with the bank account of users and organizes spending into different categories. Users of the app can be reminded of bill payments, analyse spending and set spending limits. They can also be alerted of fraudulent transactions and deductions. The app employs security measures like end to end encryption, CloudFlare protection, fraud detection, identity protection etc. Pocketbook is available via web and mobile version.

Funding rounds
Pocketbook has raised $500,000 from technology fund Tank Stream Ventures which is co-founded and backed by Markus Kahlbetzer. Other investors include TV personality David Koch, Geoff Levy, David Shein and Peter Cooper. In September 2016 Digital retail finance and payment industry player zipMoney (ASX:Z1P) bought Pocketbook in a $7.5m deal

Awards
 Personal Finance Innovator of the Year by Fintech Business Awards 2017  
 Innovator of the Year by OPTUS MyBusiness Awards 2017
 Best Finance App of 2016 by Australian Fintech
 Best Personal Finance App: Pocketbook won the 2016 Finder Innovation Awards, presented at a gala dinner hosted by media personality and The New Inventors presenter James O'Loghlin.
 Best Mobile App of the Year Winner: StartCon hosted the first annual Australasian Startup Awards. Over 200 nominations in 14 categories and an overall winner were reviewed, and winners were determined by public voting, with over 63,000 votes in total.
 Best New Startup 2014 by StartupSmart.
 Finalist in the SWIFT Innotribe startup competition in Dubai in 2013.

References

External links
 iPhone Pocketbook app
 Android Pocketbook app

Mobile applications
IOS software
Mobile software
Android (operating system) software